Jakob Benzelius (25 February 1683 in Uppsala – 29 June 1747) was Archbishop of Uppsala in the Church of Sweden from 1744 to his death.

Biography
Jakob Benzelius was the son of Archbishop Erik Benzelius the Elder (1632–1714) and Margaretha Odhelia (1653–1693). He studied at Uppsala University, graduated as filosofie magister (M.A.) in 1703. He became a lecturer  of philosophy and theologically at Uppsala.   He became church pastor in the parish of Näs in Västergötland followed by  several years visiting foreign universities. He was professor of theology at Lund University 1718–1731. He was appointed Doctor of Theology in 1725, Bishop of Gothenburg 1731–1744 and  succeeded his elder brother Erik Benzelius the Younger (1675–1743) as Archbishop of Uppsala in 1744. He was succeeded  as Archbishop by his younger brother Henric Benzelius (1689–1758). 

Jacob Benzelius   wrote several influential books on theology. He was married to  Catharina Edenberg, daughter of diplomat  Mattias Edenberg (1640–1709).

See also 
 List of Archbishops of Uppsala

References

Other sources
 Nordisk Familjebok (1878), article Jakob Benzelius In Swedish

1683 births
1747 deaths
People from Uppsala
Lutheran archbishops of Uppsala
Bishops of Gothenburg
18th-century Lutheran archbishops
Age of Liberty people

17th-century Lutheran theologians
18th-century Lutheran theologians